Arendsee is a town in the Altmarkkreis Salzwedel, Saxony-Anhalt, Germany. It is named after the lake Arendsee, located north of the town.

Geography

The municipality is located in the Altmark region and on the southern bank of the Arendsee lake, the largest and deepest natural lake in Saxony-Anhalt.

Subdivisions

The town Arendsee consists of Arendsee proper (including the Ortsteile Genzien and Gestien) and the following Ortschaften or municipal divisions:

Binde (incl. Ritzleben)
Fleetmark (incl. Lüge, Molitz, Störpke)
Höwisch
Kaulitz
Kerkau (incl. Lübbars)
Kläden (incl. Kraatz)
Kleinau (incl. Dessau, Lohne)
Leppin (incl. Harpe, Zehren)
Mechau
Neulingen
Rademin (incl. Ladekath)
Sanne-Kerkuhn (Sanne and Kerkuhn)
Schrampe (incl. Zießau)
Thielbeer (incl. Zühlen)
Vissum (incl. Kassuhn, Schernikau)
Ziemendorf

History

The locality and the lake were first mentioned in the Royal Frankish Annals in 822.

In 1184 Otto I, Margrave of Brandenburg founded a Benedictine nunnery in Arendsee while the then competent Prince-Bishop of Verden, Tammo (d. 1188), endowed it with estates.

The former municipalities Binde, Höwisch, Kaulitz, Kerkau, Kläden, Kleinau, Leppin, Neulingen, Sanne-Kerkuhn, Schrampe, Thielbeer and Ziemendorf were merged into Arendsee on 1 January 2010. The former municipalities Fleetmark, Mechau, Rademin and Vissum were merged into Arendsee on 1 January 2011.

Population development 

1964–1981 census results, from 2011: 2011 European Union census

References

External links
 

 
Altmarkkreis Salzwedel